Bedford G. Guy, sometimes written Bedford A. Guy, (August 4, 1841 - ?) was a farmer and state legislator in Texas. He served from 1879 to 1881 as a member of the Greenback Party, although other sources have him listed as Republican. He represented Washington County, Texas.

He was initially a republican nominee, and stated that he did not belong to either the left or right wings of the radical party.

He was born in Pittsylvania County, Virginia. He moved to Texas in 1869. He lived in William Penn, Texas.

See also
African-American officeholders during and following the Reconstruction era

References

Members of the Texas Legislature
Washington County, Texas
1841 births
Year of death missing